Hammond High School, established in 1977, is a public secondary school located in Columbia, Maryland, United States. It is part of the Howard County Public School System. It is located near the Kings Contrivance Village Center, south of Maryland Route 32, east of U.S. 29, and west of I-95.

Origins and history
Howard County experienced rapid population growth during the 1960s, and by the early 1970s schools in the southern part of the county were seriously overcrowded. In September 1971 Hammond Elementary-Middle School opened in Hammond Village, a large residential development near Gorman Road. The construction of a new high school that would serve the area was also a top priority for the County Board of Education, and the planned school was frequently referred to as the "Hammond Area High School." (Hammond Village derives its name from Hammond Branch, a tributary of the Little Patuxent River that flows through it. The name Hammond Branch, in turn, dates back at least to 1725). Nevertheless, because of projected future development, the location chosen in 1973 for the high school was not in Hammond Village, but was on Guilford Road in the then planned Village of Kings Contrivance.

Hammond High School was built concurrently with and with the same floor plan as Centennial High School. During the 1976–77 school year, the Hammond High School building served as the temporary home of Howard High School, whose building was being renovated. The first class of Hammond High School entered in September 1977.

Hammond's original school colors were brown, gold and white. These colors were changed to maroon and gold in 2002.

Students
Hammond High School has an official capacity of 1,220 students (not including additional capacity provided by four portable classrooms as of 2010). The student population at Hammond High School has grown moderately over the past 18 years.

The racial makeup of the population during the 2017–2018 school year was 25.8% White, 41.8% Black or African American, 10.6% Asian, 15.1% Hispanic or Latino, 0.2% Native American, 0.2% Native Hawaiian or Pacific Islander, and 6.2% two or more races.

The ethnicity demographics during the FY20 school year were ≤5.0% American Indian/Alaskan, 10.5% Asian, 40.6% Black or African American, ≤5.0% Hawaiian/Pacific Islander, 16.7% Hispanic/Latino, 24.7% White, and 7.1% two or more races.

Sports

State championships
Hammond High School currently lists eight state championships for girls' sports and six for boys' sports.

Mike Lerner, former Mr Universe, is the current athletic director

References and notes

External links

Public schools in Howard County, Maryland
Public high schools in Maryland
Educational institutions established in 1976
1976 establishments in Maryland